Timon Altwegg (born 18 May 1967) is a Swiss classical pianist who is known for playing chamber music in Europe and the Americas. Contemporary composers wrote music for him.

Career 
He was born in Münsterlingen, Altwegg began his career studying with Hubert Mahler. He received a teaching diploma of the  Schweizerischer Musikpädagogischer Verband (SMPV) in Zurich in 1989. He then studied for two years in London with Alan Rowlands at the Royal College of Music. He completed his studies in 1992 with a Piano Performing Diploma (Konzertdiplom) and the title "Associate of the Royal College of Music".

Altwegg has resided since 1992 in Kreuzlingen, being invited to play concerts in Europe and the United States, often of chamber music. In May 2004, Altwegg played as the first foreign soloist with Iraqi National Symphony Orchestra in Bagdad, and teaching a master class at the music academy in Bagdad. The event was supported by the Embassy of Switzerland, The Swiss Foreign Office and the Ministry of Culture of Iraque. It was covered in the book Shrapnels. In 2005 and 2007. Altwegg toured in South America, playing in Columbia, Ecuador, El Salvador and Guatemala.

Contemporary composers have written music for Altwegg, such as Frank Lévy a piano sonata. Altwegg forms a viola duo with his wife, Hana Gubenko. They recorded in 2015 works for viola and piano including Sonata ebraica by Graham Waterhouse.

He administers the surviving manuscripts of the British composer Freda Swain, and has begun his survey of her piano works on Toccata Classics.

References

External links 
 

Swiss classical pianists
1967 births
Living people
People from Kreuzlingen District
Alumni of the Royal College of Music
21st-century classical pianists